Vojtěch Flégl (born 24 June 1967) is a former professional tennis player from the former Czechoslovakia and later Czech Republic.  

Flégl enjoyed most of his tennis success while playing doubles. During his career, he won five doubles titles. He achieved a career-high doubles ranking of World No. 58 in 1992.

Career finals

Doubles (5 wins, 4 losses)

External links
 
 

Czech male tennis players
Czechoslovak male tennis players
Tennis players from Prague
Living people
1967 births